Kalle Niilo Ponteva Halonen (born 25 December 1940 in Kouvola) is a Finnish former ski jumper who competed between 1960 and 1967. His biggest success was the silver medal in the individual large hill at the 1960 Winter Olympics in Squaw Valley.

Halonen also won the bronze medal in the individual large hill at the 1962 FIS Nordic World Ski Championships in Zakopane. He finished second in a normal hill competition in Germany in 1964.

External links
 
 

1940 births
Living people
People from Kouvola
Finnish male ski jumpers
Olympic silver medalists for Finland
Ski jumpers at the 1960 Winter Olympics
Ski jumpers at the 1964 Winter Olympics
Olympic medalists in ski jumping
FIS Nordic World Ski Championships medalists in ski jumping
Medalists at the 1960 Winter Olympics
Sportspeople from Kymenlaakso
20th-century Finnish people